North Fayette Community School District  was a school district headquartered in West Union, Iowa.

The district is located in sections of Fayette County, and served West Union, Fayette, and Hawkeye.

History

On July 1, 1984, the Fayette School District merged into the North Fayette School District.

The North Fayette district and the Valley Community School District  began a grade-sharing arrangement, in which students of one school district attend another district's schools, in fall 2013. The two districts together had one middle school and one high school.

The merger vote for North Fayette and Valley was scheduled for Tuesday February 7, 2017. The North Fayette district residents voted in favor of the merger on a 504–17, or 97% in favor, while the Valley residents voted in favor on a 326-30 basis, or 92% in favor. On July 1, 2018, it merged into the Valley district to form the North Fayette Valley Community School District.

Schools
At one point the district had three elementary schools, one each in Fayette, Hawkeye, and West Union, as well as one middle school and one high school.

At a later period the district operated three schools: North Fayette Elementary School in Hawkeye, North Fayette Middle School in Fayette, and North Fayette High School in West Union.

References

External links
 

Defunct school districts in Iowa
2018 disestablishments in Iowa
School districts disestablished in 2018
Education in Fayette County, Iowa